Two domains in Edo period Japan had the name Mori, each with a slightly different Japanese spelling:
The  of Bungo Province, held by the Kurushima family.
The  of Izumo Province, a branch of the Matsue Domain, held by the Matsudaira family.
A Mori domain in mathematics is a type of commutative ring.